This is a list of episodes from the musical CGI animated television series Angelina Ballerina: The Next Steps.

Series overview

Episodes

Series 1 (2009)

Series 2 (2009–10)

Series 3 (2010)

Series 4 (2010)

Films (2011-2012)

References

Angelina Ballerina: The Next Steps
Angelina Ballerina: The Next Steps
Angelina Ballerina: The Next Steps